Bristol Island ( or Isla Blanca) is an  island lying midway between Montagu Island and Thule Island in the South Sandwich Islands.

Its features include Harker Point, Fryer Point, Turmoil Point, Havfruen Peak, Trulla Bluff, Grindle Rock, Wilson Rock, Freezland Rock, Mount Sourabaya, Mount Darnley, and Forsters Passage.

Bristol Island is composed of several active volcanoes with eruptions reported in 1823, 1935, 1936, 1950, 1956 and 2016.

It is the only land mass on the 59th parallel south.

History
It was discovered by a British expedition under James Cook in 1775 and named in honour of naval officer Augustus Hervey, 3rd Earl of Bristol. The first recorded landing was made by Carl Anton Larsen in 1908.

The island remains uninhabited and is administered by the United Kingdom as a British Overseas Territory as part of the South Georgia and the South Sandwich Islands dependency. Along with the rest of the South Sandwich Islands, it is claimed by Argentina in their South Atlantic Islands Department (Islas del Atlántico Sur) of Tierra del Fuego Province. Argentina did not attempt to occupy the island during the Falklands War.

Gallery

See also
List of Antarctic and sub-Antarctic islands
List of volcanoes in South Sandwich Islands

References

Volcano.und.edu
Exploring Polar Frontiers: A Historical Encyclopedia, Volume 1, By William James Mills

External links

Islands of the South Sandwich Islands
Volcanoes of the Atlantic Ocean
Volcanoes of South Georgia and the South Sandwich Islands
Active volcanoes
Uninhabited islands of South Georgia and the South Sandwich Islands